Built to Spill Plays the Songs of Daniel Johnston is a cover and tribute album by American indie rock band Built to Spill. It was released on June 12, 2020, by Ernest Jenning.

Track listing

Personnel
 Jason Albertini – bass
 Steve Gere – drums
 Doug Martsch – guitar, vocals
 Chris Parks – mastering
 Jim Roth – engineer
 Tae Won Yu – artwork

References

2020 albums
Built to Spill albums
Tribute albums